Bayport may refer to:

Places

Canada 
Bayport, Nova Scotia

United States 
Bayport, Florida
Bayport, Minnesota
Bayport, New York
Bayport (LIRR station), a station stop along the Montauk Branch of the Long Island Rail Road
Bayport, Wisconsin, a former town
Bayport Container Terminal of the Port of Houston
Bayport Industrial District near La Porte and Pasadena, Texas
Cos Cob, Connecticut, had the official Post Office name of Bayport

Other uses 
Bayport (The Hardy Boys), the fictional setting for the Hardy Boys series of young-adult detective novels

See also
Bay Port, Michigan